Buddleja speciosissima is a rare species restricted to Mount Itatiaia in Brazil, where it grows in rocky grassland at elevations of 2,000–2,500 m. It was first described and named by Taubert in 1893.

Description
Buddleja speciosissima is a shrub 1–3 m high with light-brown fissured bark. It bears hermaphroditic flowers, unlike most South American members of the genus which are cryptically dioecious.  The young branches are thick, subquadrangular, and covered with a dense pale yellow indumentum, bearing subcoriaceous elliptic to lanceolate leaves with 1–3.5 cm petioles, and measuring 10–18 cm long by 2–4 cm wide, glabrescent above but tomentose below. The reddish-orange leafy inflorescences are 10–20 cm long, comprising 1–2 orders of branches bearing paired three flowered cymes, the corollas 25–30 mm long by 4 mm wide, pollination being by hummingbirds. Ploidy: 2n = 38.

Cultivation
The shrub is rare in cultivation.

References

speciosissima
Flora of Brazil
Flora of South America